Elvin Lamont Bethea (born March 1, 1946) is an American former professional football player who pent his entire career as a defensive end with the Houston Oilers of the American Football League (AFL) and National Football League (NFL). He played college football at North Carolina A&T State University and was the first person from the school to be elected to the Pro Football Hall of Fame, having been inducted in 2003.

Career

Bethea was born in Trenton, New Jersey, and played high school football and track at Trenton Central High School.  He set the New Jersey state record in the shot put in 1964 – 66 feet 4.5 inches - which stood until 1997.  He won the shot put and discus competitions at the Golden West Invitational track meet in 1964.

During his career in Houston, Bethea played in 210 games, including a stretch of 135 consecutive. He played at defensive end and guard in the 1968 season and didn't miss a game until breaking his arm in a game against the Oakland Raiders in 1977. He led the team in sacks six times, finishing his career with 105 unofficial sacks.

His career high was in 1973 with 16 sacks, which still ranks as the best in Oilers/Tennessee Titans history, a feat made more remarkable by the Oilers' 1-13 record. In 1976 Bethea recorded  sacks, yet was not voted to the Pro Bowl. In a game against the San Diego Chargers in 1976, he recorded four sacks (his career high) and had one fumble recovery.

He also had  sacks in 1969. Other notable seasons in terms of sacks were: 1970 and 1971 with  sacks in each, 1975 with 10 and 1978 with 8. He played in the AFC Championship game in 1978 and 1979.

Awards and honors
Bethea was Second-team All-Pro in 1969, 1973, 1978 and 1979 to go with his 8 Pro Bowl selections.

Bethea was elected to the Pro Football Hall of Fame in 2003. He was officially inducted during the Enshrinement Ceremony on August 3, 2003, where his college coach and presenter, Hornsby Howell, unveiled the bust of Bethea, which was sculpted by Scott Myers.

In 2005, Bethea was inducted to the North Carolina Sports Hall of Fame

Book
Bethea is the author of Smash-Mouth: My Football Journey from Trenton to Canton.

References

External links
Member profile – Pro Football Hall of Fame

1946 births
Living people
Players of American football from Trenton, New Jersey
Trenton Central High School alumni
American football defensive ends
North Carolina A&T Aggies football players
Houston Oilers players
American Conference Pro Bowl players
American Football League All-Star players
Pro Football Hall of Fame inductees
American Football League players
National Football League players with retired numbers